Gliders India Limited (GIL) is an Indian state-owned defence company, headquartered at Ordnance Parachute Factory in Kanpur, India established in 2021 as part of the restructuring and corporatisation of the Ordnance Factory Board into seven different Public Sector Undertakings. GIL primarily manufactures military parachutes for the use of the Indian Armed Forces and foreign militaries and parachutes for aero-sport and emergency services.

GIL's main manufacturing facility is the Ordnance Parachute Factory in Kanpur.

See also
Other PSUs formed from Ordnance Factory Board:-
Advanced Weapons and Equipment India Limited (AWE), Kanpur
Armoured Vehicles Nigam Limited (AVANI), Chennai
India Optel Limited (IOL), Dehradun
Munitions India Limited (MIL), Pune
Troop Comforts Limited (TCL), Kanpur
Yantra India Limited (YIL), Nagpur

References

Defence companies of India
Government-owned companies of India
Indian companies established in 2021